William Bayly, Bayley or Bayliffe JP ( 1540 – 1612) was an English barrister and administrator who briefly served as a Member for the borough of Chippenham in the English Parliament of 1572.

Early life and family
Bayly was born at Chippenham around 1540. He was the son of John Bayly, a lawyer at Lyon's Inn  and Joan or Jone, both of Castle Cary, Somerset. The Bayly family were of reasonable nobility; they were armigerous and allied, mostly in providing legal and agency assistance, to the influential Seymour family. On 27 November 1559, aged 19, William was admitted to the Middle Temple for training as a barrister. Completing his tuition, he was called to the Bar and subsequently granted the lease to Chippenham's Monkton House and half its estate (400 acres) in 1567 by Gabriel Pleydell, an infamous politician who had once conspired to exile Queen Mary I. Bayly became Pleydell's son-in-law through his marriage to Gabriel's only daughter, Agnes, in St Andrew's Church, Chippenham. The section of the church in which they married was formerly named "Bayliffe's Aisle" in their honour.

References

Notes

Footnotes

Bibliography

 
 

1540 births
1612 deaths
16th-century English lawyers
English justices of the peace
English MPs 1572–1583
Members of the Middle Temple
People from Chippenham